Gargoyles the Movie: The Heroes Awaken is a 1995 animated fantasy film produced by Walt Disney Television Animation. The film is actually the five-episode pilot ("Awakening") of the animated television series Gargoyles edited into one long feature film, approximately 100 minutes in length. As a result, numerous scenes from the original broadcast episodes were cut due to time constraints.  In addition, a number of scenes were also moved around and some dialogue was changed.  The episodes were produced and aired in 1994, and the film was released to laserdisc and VHS in February 1995 and featured an interactive VHS/LD board game. The pilot episodes have been released to DVD as part of Gargoyles: Season 1.

Plot
 
In Scotland, 994 A.D., Castle Wyvern is under attack by Vikings, led by the ruthless Hakon. The resident warriors struggle to repel the attack until the sun sets, where at night, the seemingly lifeless stone gargoyle statues awaken, revealing themselves to be real living gargoyles. Led by Goliath, the powerful gargoyle clan subsequently defends the castle and successfully forces the Vikings to retreat. The human captain of the guard sees them as heroes, but their heroism does nothing to earn appreciation from Princess Katherine, the court wizard Magus, or the other human residents, most of whom still see them as monsters and treat them with prejudice. Goliath's lover and the Captain argue that the gargoyles deserve more praise and dignity, especially since the castle is built on top of the land that originally belonged to the gargoyles, but Goliath adamantly insists that they must endure being misunderstood and protect the castle and all of its residents. The Captain urges Goliath to take his clan away from the castle the following night, but Goliath refuses, remaining determined to protect the castle.

Meanwhile, three youthful gargoyles and their dog-like gargoyle hound are unfairly harassed by a paranoid mother in the courtyard, and despite their efforts to appease, they are forced to frighten their harassers to defend themselves. Goliath subsequently reprimands them for threatening the humans and orders them to remain in their nesting caverns where the clan's eggs are resting. Goliath and his older gargoyle mentor then proceed to chase after the Vikings, but realize they were led into a diversion. Unable to return to the castle in time, the sun rises, forcing them back into stone sleep. The castle is once again attacked by Hakon and the Vikings, but the captain of the guard, disgusted by the scorn and prejudice of his people against the gargoyles, betrays the castle and Princess Katherine to the Vikings, and the battle is lost during the day. Although he wants to leave the castle to the gargoyles, he fails to convince Hakon that the Gargoyles won't chase after them, and watches as Hakon destroys the gargoyles while they are helpless in their stone sleep.

That night, Goliath and his mentor return home to find the castle in ruins, the inhabitants gone, and most of his gargoyle brothers and sisters in rubble. Only the three gargoyle youths and their hound have survived due to Goliath previously sending them into the caverns. Far from the castle, the Vikings set up camp with Princess Katherine, Magus, and the other townspeople as their captives. Having betrayed his people, the Captain remains with the Vikings, and Hakon taunts Magus by passively burning pages from his magic book of spells, the Grimorum Arcanorum. When the surviving gargoyles arrive to free the people and defeat the Vikings, Hakon and the Captain flee with Princess Katherine, leaving an enraged Magus behind, who casts a curse on the gargoyles after believing their arrival may have caused Katherine's death at Hakon's hands. Goliath pursues Hakon, the Captain, and Katherine, and confronts the Captain for his treachery. When Hakon blames the slaughter of Goliath's siblings on the Captain, the Captain angrily attacks him and they both fall off a cliff to their deaths, while Goliath manages to save and free Katherine, but finds the remaining members of his clan in stone sleep, unable to wake even at night. Realizing that Katherine is alive and well, Magus realizes his grave mistake, and because the pages from the Grimorum Arcanorum needed to break the spell were burned, the gargoyle clan will remain cursed in stone sleep until "the castle rises above the clouds". Grief-stricken and alone, Goliath leaves his clan's eggs in the care of the guilt-ridden Katherine and Magus, and requests Magus to cast his spell on him, so that he can remain with his clan and share their fate.

A thousand years later, in 1994, opportunistic billionaire David Xanatos claims the long abandoned Castle Wyvern and has it reconstructed at the top of his skyscraper in New York City, along with the sleeping gargoyles. Goliath finally awakens and happily reunites with his clan, but they are shocked to awaken in a completely different world in the late-20th century. Xanatos explains that he recovered and translated the Grimorum Arcanorum, and followed its instructions to awaken the gargoyles, written by Magus, and approaches them as a friend. Not long after their awakening, the castle is suddenly attacked by a group of armed commandos from a helicopter, but the gargoyles defend the castle against the attackers until they flee. The fight results in falling debris and damages to the streets below, causing police detective Elisa Maza to climb up to the castle to investigate the battle. She discovers Goliath and the gargoyles, but they manage to hesitantly befriend each other. The gargoyles decide to name themselves after various locations in New York and explore their new surroundings. The elder mentor names himself Hudson, while the young trio name themselves Brooklyn, Lexington, and Broadway, and their hound is named Bronx. Meanwhile, Xanatos reunites Goliath with his mate, who reveals herself to have survived the massacre of their clan and survived until the modern time. Having earned their trust, Xanatos convinces the clan to help steal back important data discs that were supposedly stolen from him during the commando attack.

After they successfully return from their mission, Elisa goes to speak with Goliath in private about the theft. They are suddenly attacked by the same commandos from before, but manage to survive the attack through the night, and Elisa defends the sleeping Goliath during the day. Elisa investigates the theft and reveals to Goliath that the commandos were employed by Xanatos, and that Xanatos has been manipulating Goliath.

No longer needing the gargoyles, Xanatos sets his clan of robotic steel gargoyles to destroy them, but the real gargoyles manage to fight back and destroy the unintelligent robots. Goliath's lover reveals that her name is Demona, and that she is conspiring with Xanatos. She also reveals that a thousand years ago, before their clan was massacred by the Vikings, she conspired with the Captain of the guard to betray Princess Katherine and the townspeople so that the gargoyles could have the castle all to themselves, as the castle was built on their land and was rightfully theirs to begin with. But after many betrayals and deaths of their kind, she now hates all of humanity and considers the human race as their enemies. Goliath and the rest of the clan reject her desire to fight against the human race, and she decides that Goliath is also her enemy and tries to kill him. Elisa arrives just in time to intervene and tackles Demona, causing her to accidentally fire her laser weapon at the castle, destroying a portion of it. Demona and Elisa fall from the collapsing castle ledge, but Goliath catches and saves Elisa, while Demona continues to fall until she disappears.

Enraged at this loss, Goliath attempts to kill Xanatos until Elisa convinces him not to, claiming that if he does, he would be no morally better than Demona. Xanatos is arrested for possession of stolen property and the few surviving gargoyles now accept their new lives in their new home in New York, with Elisa now their friend and confidante.

Cast

Reception 
TV Guide rated the film 2/4 stars.  The reviewer called the art "acceptable" but said the style owes a debt to Batman: The Animated Series.

References

External links

 

1995 animated films
1995 films
1995 direct-to-video films
1995 television films
Gargoyles (TV series)
Disney direct-to-video animated films
Television films as pilots
Animated films based on animated series
Animated films set in New York City
1990s American animated films
Disney Television Animation films
Japanese animated fantasy films
Films set in 1994
1990s English-language films